Club Baloncesto Estudiantes, S.A.D., known simply as Estu and as Movistar Estudiantes for sponsorship reasons, is a basketball team based in the city of Madrid, Spain. It is a member of the Asociación de Clubes de Baloncesto (ACB). Founded in 1948, it is one of the most recognized basketball teams in Spain.

Some of its achievements include winning three Spanish Cups and reaching the ACB Finals in 2004. The club is also particularly famous for its renowned youth programme that has produced many Spanish talents over the years such as Alberto Herreros, Nacho Azofra, Aíto García Reneses, Alfonso Reyes, Felipe Reyes, Carlos Jiménez, Iñaki de Miguel, Pepu Hernández or Juancho Hernangómez.

Sponsorship naming
Along the years CB Estudiantes has had several sponsorship names:

History

The club was founded in 1948 by a group of students (the "Estudiantes") of a public preparatory school (the Instituto Ramiro de Maeztu, IRM) in Madrid.

By the time when the first Spanish-wide season-long championship was organized in 1955, by the Spanish Basketball Association (FEB), it was one of the six clubs participating in that tournament, as the second best team from the Province of Madrid (the first being Real Madrid. Since then, it has always participated in the premier Spanish basketball league. It is one of only three of such clubs, together with Real Madrid and Joventut. It is also one of two only Spanish basketball clubs with teams both at the top male and female Spanish championships.

In May 2012, Estudiantes was relegated for the first time in its history from the top tier of Spanish basketball, but remained in the league because LEB Oro champion CB 1939 Canarias didn't present the required documentation and money.

Home arenas

La Nevera (The IRM Arena): (1948–71)
Polideportivo Antonio Magariños: (1971–87)
Palacio Vistalegre: (2001–2005)
Madrid Arena: (2005–2010)
Palacio de Deportes de la Comunidad de Madrid: (1987–2001, 2010–present)

Rivalries
Estudiantes has a rivalry with Real Madrid. Both teams meet in the Madrid basketball derby.

Players

Basketball Hall of Famers
 Antonio Díaz-Miguel, F, 1950–1952, 1953–1958, Inducted 1997

Current roster

Depth chart

Notable players

 José Miguel Antúnez
 Víctor Arteaga
 Nacho Azofra
 Javier Beirán
 Darío Brizuela
 Jesús Codina
 Quino Colom
 Rodrigo de la Fuente
 Iñaki de Miguel 
 Antonio Díaz-Miguel
 Miguel Estrada
 Jaime Fernández
 Germán Gabriel
 Aíto García Reneses
 Fran Guerra
 Juancho Hernangómez
 Alberto Herreros
 Iker Iturbe
 Carlos Jiménez
 Oriol Junyent 
 Antonio Martín
 Fernando Martín
 Nacho Martín
 Juan Antonio Martínez
 Javier Mendiburu
 Albert Oliver
 Juan Antonio Orenga
 Xavi Rabaseda
 Vicente Ramos
 Xavi Rey
 Alfonso Reyes
 Felipe Reyes
 Sergio Rodríguez
 Gonzalo Sagi-Vela
 José Sagi-Vela
 Javi Salgado
 Carlos Suárez
 Rafael Vecina
 Édgar Vicedo
 Pancho Jasen
 Nicolás Laprovíttola
 Federico Van Lacke
 Sylven Landesberg
 Nik Caner-Medley
 Yannick Driesen 
John Roberson
 Lucas Nogueira
 Caio Torres
 Dejan Ivanov
 Carl English
 Levon Kendall
 Philip Scrubb
 Nacho Arroyo 
 Juan Palacios
 Marko Banić
 Danko Cvjetičanin
 Željko Šakić
 Goran Suton
 Ondřej Balvín
 Jiří Welsch
 Kevin Larsen
 Josh Asselin
 Ángel Delgado
 Luis Flores
 Jamar Wilson
 Tariq Kirksay
 Edwin Jackson
 Michel Morandais
 Florent Piétrus 
 Ali Traoré
 Tyrone Ellis
 Viktor Sanikidze
 Pietro Aradori
 Alessandro Gentile
 Mārtiņš Laksa
 Shayne Whittington
 Omar Cook
 Nemanja Đurišić
 Goran Nikolić
 Nicolas de Jong
 Torgeir Bryn
 Rubén Garcés
 J. J. Barea
 Gian Clavell
 Mikhail Mikhailov 
 Sitapha Savané
 Aleksa Avramović
 Stefan Birčević 
 Nemanja Dangubić 
 Nikola Lončar
 Petar Popović 
 Vladimir Štimac
 Domen Lorbek 
 Uroš Slokar 
 Samo Udrih
 Martin Rančík
 Ludvig Håkanson
 Daniel Clark
 Vitaly Potapenko
 Jayson Granger
 Gary Alexander
 Corey Brewer
 Alec Brown
 Louis Bullock
 Vonteego Cummings 
 Toney Douglas
 Marlon Garnett
 Keith Jennings 
 Kyle Kuric
 Chris Lofton 
 Will McDonald
 Tony Mitchell
 Andrae Patterson
 John Pinone
 Phil Pressey 
 David Russell 
 Walker Russell
 Cedric Simmons
 Terry Stotts
 Ron Taylor
 Shaun Vandiver
 Glen Whisby
 Eric White
 Harper Williams
 Rickie Winslow
 Antoine Wright

Head coach

 Rafael Laborde: 1948–1949, 1953–1955, 1956
 Miguel Parrilla: 1949-1951
 Leopoldo Bermúdez: 1951-1953
 Víctor Díaz: 1955-1956
 Héctor Rodríguez: 1956 (int.)
 José Antonio Garrido: 1956-1957
 Roberto Bermúdez: 1957, 1959–1960, 1974-1975
 Emilio Tejada: 1957-1958
 Ramón Uturbi: 1958-1959
 Jaime Bolea: 1960-1963
 Jesús Codina: 1963–1964, 1973–1974, 1979-1981
 Francisco Hernández: 1964-1965
 Ignacio Pinedo: 1965-1973
 Fernando Bermúdez: 1975-1976
 José Ramón Ramos: 1976-1979
 Fernando Martínez Arroyo: 1979
 Antonio Gómez Carra: 1981-1983
 Paco Garrido: 1983-1988
 Miguel Ángel Martín: 1988-1994
 Pepu Hernández: 1994–2001, 2001–2005, 2011–2012
 Charly Sáinz de Aja: 2001
 Juan Antonio Orenga: 2005-2006
 Pedro Martínez: 2006-2007
 Mariano de Pablos: 2007
  Javier Carlos González: 2007 (int.)
 Velimir Perasović: 2007-2008
 Luis Casimiro: 2008-2011
 Trifón Poch: 2012
 Txus Vidorreta: 2012-2015
 Diego Ocampo: 2015-2016
 Alberto Lorenzo: 2016 (int.)
 Sergio Valdeolmillos: 2016
 Salva Maldonado: 2016-2018
 Josep Maria Berrocal: 2018-2019
 Aleksandar Džikić: 2019-2020
 Javier Zamora: 2020-2021
 Jota Cuspinera: 2021-2022
 Diego Epifanio: 2022
 Javi Rodríguez: 2022–present

Presidents

Antonio Magariños: 1948-1964
Anselmo López: 1964 (int.)
José Hermida: 1964-1971
Pedro Dellmans: 1971-1983
Juan Francisco Moneo: 1983-1999
Alejandro González Varona: 1999-2004
Juan Francisco García: 2004-2005 
Fernando Bermúdez: 2005-2008
Javier Tejedor: 2008
Juan Francisco García: 2008-2014 
Fernando Galindo: 2014-2022
Ignacio Triana: 2022–present

Season by season

Honours

Domestic competitions
Liga ACB
 Runners-up (4): 1962–63, 1967–68, 1980–81, 2003–04
Copa del Rey de Baloncesto (Spanish King's Cup)
 Winners (3): 1963, 1992, 2000
 Runners-up (4): 1962, 1973, 1975, 1991
 Copa Princesa de Asturias (Spanish Princess' Cup)
 Winners (2): 1986, 2022

European competitions
EuroLeague
 4th place (1): 1991–92
 Final Four (1): 1992
FIBA Saporta Cup (defunct) 
 Semifinalists (2): 1973–74, 1975–76
FIBA Korać Cup (defunct)
 Runners-up (1): 1998–99
EuroCup Basketball 
 Semifinalists (2): 2002–03, 2003–04
FIBA EuroChallenge (defunct)
 4th place (1): 2006–07
 Final Four (1): 2007

Other competitions
 FIBA International Christmas Tournament (defunct)
 Winners (1):1992
 4th place (4): 1972, 1974, 1975, 1993
 Torneo Comunidad de Madrid (defunct)
 Winnners (8): 1988, 1990, 1992, 1993, 1996, 1999, 2001, 2002, 2003
 Albacete, Spain Invitational Game
 Winners (1): 2014
 Torneo Ciudad de Getafe
 Winners (1): 2019

Individual awards

Spanish Cup MVP
 Juan Antonio Orenga – 1991
 John Pinone – 1992
 Alfonso Reyes – 2000

ACB Rising Star
Sergio Rodríguez – 2005
Carlos Suárez – 2006
Juan Hernangómez – 2016

ACB Slam Dunk Champion
David Russell – 1986, 1987
Ricky Winslow – 1990
Chandler Thompson – 1996, 1998

ACB Three Point Shootout Champion
Danko Cvjetičanin – 1993
Keith Jennings – 1996

All-ACB First Team
Carlos Jiménez – 2006
Carlos Suárez – 2010
Nik Caner-Medley – 2011
Edwin Jackson – 2017
Sylven Landesberg – 2018

Women's team
CB Estudiantes has also a women's team which was founded in 1989 and played during several seasons in Liga Femenina, the Spanish women's basketball top tier. It currently plays in Liga Femenina.

Season by season

References

External links
  

 
Basketball teams established in 1948
Liga ACB teams
Basketball teams in the Community of Madrid
Women's basketball teams in Spain
Sports teams in Madrid